The Waco Metropolitan Statistical Area, as defined by the United States Census Bureau, is an area consisting of McLennan and Falls counties in Central Texas, anchored by the city of Waco. As of the 1 April 2010 census (which included only McLennan County), the MSA had a population of 234,906.  The 2021 population estimate is 280,428 which includes Falls County (added to the Waco MSA in 2013).

Counties
McLennan
Falls

Communities

Incorporated places

McLennan
City of Bellmead
City of Beverly Hills
City of Bruceville-Eddy (partial)
Town of Crawford
City of Gholson
City of Golinda (partial)
City of Hallsburg
City of Hewitt
City of Lacy Lakeview
City of Leroy
City of Lorena
City of Mart
City of McGregor (partial)
City of Moody
City of Riesel
City of Robinson
City of Ross
City of Valley Mills (partial)
City of Waco (Principal city)
City of West
City of Woodway

Falls
Bruceville-Eddy (parial)
Golinda (partial)
Lott
Marlin
Rosebud

Unincorporated places

McLennan
Axtell
China Spring
Elm Mott
Speegleville
Downsville
Asa

Falls
Barclay
Cedar Springs
Cego
Chilton
Durango
Highbank
Mooreville
Otto
Perry
Reagan
Satin
Tomlinson Hill
Travis
Westphalia
Zipperlandville

See also
Texas census statistical areas

References

Metropolitan areas of Texas
Geography of McLennan County, Texas